Lacrimabili statu is an encyclical written by Pope Pius X dated June 7, 1912 that condemned the exploitation of the natives of the Amazon rainforest.

References

Papal encyclicals
Amazon rainforest